Sir Henry Lewis Guy CBE, FRS, (15 June 1887 – 20 July 1956) was a leading British mechanical engineer, notable in particular for his work on steam turbine design.

Early life
Guy was born at Penarth, in the Vale of Glamorgan, Wales in 1887. Following his education he joined the Taff Vale Railway as a student apprentice, and studied at the University College of South Wales where he gained a diploma in mechanical and electrical engineering.  Guy was a Whitworth Exhibitioner in 1908

Career
In 1915, Guy joined the British Westinghouse Company, (later to become Metropolitan-Vickers) as a design engineer. In 1918 he was appointed chief mechanical engineer at that company, a post he was to hold until 1941. Whilst at Metrovicks, Guy was responsible for many innovations in the design of steam turbo-generators.

Guy was elected a Fellow of the Royal Society in 1936.

During World War II, Guy served on a number committees including the Scientific Advisory Council of the Ministry of Supply. He was awarded a CBE in 1943 followed by a knighthood in 1949.

From 1941 until his retirement in 1951, Guy was secretary of the Institution of Mechanical Engineers.  After retirement, Guy was President of the Whitworth Society in 1952.

References

1887 births
1956 deaths
People from Penarth
Fellows of the Royal Society
Commanders of the Order of the British Empire
Welsh engineers
British mechanical engineers
Metropolitan-Vickers people
People educated at Stanwell School
20th-century British engineers